Sajek Valley is one of the most popular tourist spots in Bangladesh situated among the hills of the  Kasalong range of mountains in Sajek union, Baghaichhari Upazila in Rangamati District. Sajek Valley is known as the Queen of Hills & Roof of Rangamati.

Origin of name
The name of Sajek Valley came from the Sajek River that originates from Karnafuli river. The Sajek river works as a border between Bangladesh and India.

Location
Sajek is a union located in the north of Chittagong Hill Tracts.

Nature
Sajek valley is known for its natural environment and is surrounded by mountains, dense forest, and grassland hill tracks. Many small rivers flow through the mountains among which the Kachalong and the Machalong are notable. On the way to Sajek valley, one has to cross the Mayni range and the Mayni river. The road to Sajek has high peaks and falls.

People and culture
The native people of Sajek valley are ethnic minorities. Among them Chakma, Marma, Tripuri, Pankho, Kaibarta, Lushai and other indigenous communities are mentionable. Women seem to be more involved in economic activities here. Tea stalls, food joints and roadside marketplaces are dominated by women. Picking fruits and vegetables early in the morning is a common trade here. They are not fluent in Bengali, but the young population speak some English.

Gallery

References

External links
Tourism in Sajek
 Sajek Valley Tour

Rangamati Hill District
Tourist attractions in Bangladesh